Araeomerus hubbardi is a species of earwigs, in the genus Araeomerus, family Hemimeridae, the suborder Hemimerina, and the order Dermaptera.

References 

Insects described in 1974
Hemimerina